Themis Zambrzycki (married name Glatman) (born October 20, 1960) is a retired Brazilian multi-sport athlete and tennis player.

She was the 1976 South American Junior Champion in the long jump, shot put and pentathlon, plus the silver medalist in the 100 metres hurdles.  In 1977 she competed at the senior level South American Championships, taking silver in the hurdles, long jump and pentathlon.   In 1979, she won the long jump and pentathlon, with a silver in the shot put.

She competed for Brigham Young University from 1978–80, winning the AIAW National Championship in the outdoor Pentathlon all three years and indoor champion in 1980.  During her years in the United States, she also competed in the national championships, placing in the pentathlon all three years, winning in 1980.

Along with many track and field athletes of the day, she was an athlete/actress in the 1982 released film Personal Best.

As money making opportunities for track and field athletes, particularly female athletes, were rare, she changed her focus to professional tennis, making it to the WTA tour by 1986.

ITF finals

Singles (1–1)

Doubles (2–6)

References

Living people
1960 births
Brazilian female tennis players
Brazilian pentathletes
Brazilian female long jumpers
Brazilian female hurdlers
Brazilian female shot putters
Brazilian actresses